José Bezerra Coutinho (February 7, 1910 – November 7, 2008) was a Brazilian bishop of the Roman Catholic Church. When he died at the age of 98, he was the sixth-oldest bishop in the Catholic Church and oldest Brazilian bishop.

Biography
Coutinho was born in Capistrano, in the state of Ceará, in 1910. He was ordained a priest on December 3, 1933, then appointed auxiliary bishop of Sobral, Ceará, on August 4, 1956. Coutinho was appointed bishop of Estância, Sergipe, on January 28, 1961, retiring as bishop of Estância on June 1, 1985.

He was Titular Bishop of Uthina from October 28, 1956 to January 28, 1961.

He died in Fortaleza, Ceará, of cardiac arrest on November 7, 2008.

See also
Roman Catholic Diocese of Estância

References

External links
Catholic Hierarchy

1910 births
2008 deaths
Participants in the Second Vatican Council
20th-century Roman Catholic bishops in Brazil
Roman Catholic bishops of Estância
Roman Catholic bishops of Sobral